Abida is a genus of small air-breathing land snails, terrestrial gastropod mollusks in the family Chondrinidae.

Distribution
This is a European genus. It consists of about 10 species, most of which are restricted to the Pyrenees and Cantabrian mountains in France and Spain. Only Abida secale and Abida polyodon occur outside this area.

Species
The species in this genus include:
 Abida ateni Gittenberger, 1973
 Abida attenuata (Fagot, 1886)
 Abida bigerrensis (Moquin-Tandon, 1856)
 Abida cylindrica (Michaud, 1829)
 Abida gittenbergeri Bössneck, 2000
 Abida occidentalis (Fagot, 1888)
 Abida partioti (Saint-Simon, 1848)
 Abida polyodon (Draparnaud, 1801)
 Abida pyrenaearia (Michaud, 1831)
 Abida secale (Draparnaud, 1801)
 Abida vasconica (Kobelt, 1882)
 Abida vergniesiana (Küster, 1847)

Habitat
The species in this genus all are restricted to areas with calcareous rocks, i.e. limestone areas.

References

External links
 

Chondrinidae
Gastropods of Europe
Taxa named by William Turton